Romanians in Spain form the second largest group of foreigners in the country, after Moroccans. , there were 623,097 Romanians in Spain. Most of the immigration took place given economic reasons. The linguistic similarities between Romanian and Spanish, as well as Romanians' Latin identity, are also a reason for the country's attractiveness to Romanians.

Currently the number of Romanians in Spain is decreasing. In 2012, there were 897,203 Romanians living in Spain, in 2021 their number decreased to 556,204.

Background
After the December, 1989 Romanian Revolution, emigration was liberalized, but for the next few years, emigration to Spain was modest. It started to increase slowly during the late 1990s, and exploded after 2002. Emigration was further facilitated by the entry of Romania in the EU in 2007. By 2011, it reached a peak of nearly 900,000 people, after which the Romanian population has been steadily decreasing as a result of emigration from Spain since 2012 due to the economic problems and unemployment in the country, falling to 623,097 by 2022. Because of this, the diaspora in Italy, which has continued to increase, is now considerably larger than that in Spain.

Population

Romanian diaspora in Spain is today the second Romanian diaspora in the EU, after that of Italy. In recent years, emigration to Southern Europe has started to slow down, with many Romanians now preferring Northern European countries such as Germany, Sweden and the United Kingdom.

Notable individuals

Alexandru Buligan (b. 1960) – handball player and coach
Mihaela Ciobanu (b. 1973) – handball player
Cosmin Contra (b. 1975) – footballer and coach
Gheorghe Craioveanu (b. 1968) – footballer
Alexandru Dedu (b. 1971) – handball player
Constantin Gâlcă (b. 1972) – footballer and coach
Cristian Ganea (b. 1992) – footballer
Adrian Ilie (b. 1974) – footballer
Valeriu Lazarov (1935–2009) – television producer, director of Spanish channel Telecinco 
Gheorghe Popescu (b. 1967) – footballer
Roxana Popa (b. 1997) – artistic gymnast 
Virgil Popa (b. 1975) – conductor 
Marcela Topor (b. 1976) – journalist
 (b. 1981), activist

See also
Romania–Spain relations
Romance-speaking Europe

References

Sources

Spain
Ethnic groups in Spain
Romanian minorities in Europe
 
Romanian emigrants to Spain